Holy Trinity Monastery, East Hendred was home to a monastery of contemplative Benedictine nuns situated in the Vale of White Horse, Oxfordshire, from 2004 to 2012, forming part of the Roman Catholic Diocese of Portsmouth. In late May 2012 the community relocated to Howton Grove, Wormbridge, Herefordshire, where it is part of the Roman Catholic Archdiocese of Cardiff. The community retains its dedication to the Most Holy Trinity but, following Benedictine custom, is also known by the name of the locality to which it has moved, so that it is now called Howton Grove Priory.

History
Founded in 2004 by Bishop Crispian Hollis, it is the first monastery of Benedictine nuns to have been established in England for more than half a century. The founding members were originally nuns of Stanbrook Abbey, Worcester, but the community is an autonomous monastery of diocesan right with monastic rather than papal enclosure.

Charitable works
The nuns maintain themselves and their charitable undertakings by their work, principally book and web development. They make audio books for the blind and visually impaired and provide a postal library lending service. Their monastery web site is well known for its innovative use of new media and is an important element in the community's spiritual outreach. In 2009 it won the Premier Christian Media People's Choice Award. The monastery library has important collections of modern American and High Anglican theology and is open to students and others by appointment.

Location
The nuns' first home was the presbytery, or priest's house, at East Hendred. They have now bought a barn conversion on the edge of the Golden Valley, Herefordshire.

References

External links 
 Holy Trinity Monastery official web site
 Holy Trinity Monastery Mobile web site
 iBenedictines: Holy Trinity Monastery official blog

Benedictine monasteries in England
Benedictine nunneries in England
Monasteries in Herefordshire
Christian organizations established in 2004
Vale of White Horse